FC Nantes won Division 1 season 1965/1966 of the French Association Football League with 60 points.

Participating teams

 Angers SCO
 Bordeaux
 AS Cannes
 RC Lens
 Lille OSC
 Olympique Lyonnais
 AS Monaco
 FC Nantes
 OGC Nice
 Nîmes Olympique
 Red Star Olympique
 Stade Rennais UC
 FC Rouen
 AS Saint-Etienne
 UA Sedan-Torcy
 FC Sochaux-Montbéliard
 Stade de Paris FC
 RC Strasbourg
 Toulouse FC (1937)
 US Valenciennes-Anzin

League table

Promoted from Division 2, who will play in Division 1 season 1966/1967
 Stade de Reims: Champion of Division 2
 Olympique de Marseille: runner-up of Division 2

Merger at the end of the season
 UA Sedan-Torcy with RC Paris, become RC Paris-Sedan

Results

Top goalscorers

References
 Division 1 season 1965-1966 at pari-et-gagne.com

Ligue 1 seasons
French
1